Nur-Ali Khalifa, also known as Nur-Ali Khalifa Rumlu, was an early 16th-century Iranian military leader and official from the Turkoman Rumlu tribe. He served as the governor of Erzincan from  during the reign of Safavid Shah Ismail I (1501–1524). 

Nur-Ali Khalifa was a pivotal figure in the early days of the Safavid realm. His large-scale campaign in Anatolia in 1512, with troops levied on the spot from Sufis belonging to the Safavid order and which coincided with the ascension of Selim I (r. 1512-1520) to the throne, was one of the casus belli that lead to the Battle of Chaldiran (1514). This Safavid force led by Nur-Ali Khalifa penetrated deep into Anatolia, captured and sacked the town of Tokat, had the khotbeh read there in Ismail I's name, and managed to defeat an Ottoman army led by Sinan Pasha that was sent after them. 

During the decisive Chaldiran battle, Nur-Ali Khalifa and Mohammad Khan Ustajlu were Ismail I's (r. 1501-1524) commanders who had first-hand experience with the Ottoman ways of warfare. They both advised to attack at once, in order to prevent the Ottoman's from establishing their proper defensive positions, but were rudely rebuffed by Durmish Khan Shamlu. Durmish Khan considered it "cowardly to engage an unprepared enemy". Ismail I chose to endorse Durmish Khan Shamlu's suggestion for the attack and thus the Ottomans were allowed to prepare their defenses at their leisure; this would prove costly, contributing to the sound Safavid defeat at Chaldiran.

References

Sources

  
 
 

16th-century deaths
Iranian Turkmen people
Safavid generals
History of Erzincan
Safavid governors
Rumlu
16th-century people of Safavid Iran